Vasyl Popovych (12 September 1796 – 19 October 1864) was a Ruthenian Greek Catholic hierarch. He was bishop of the Ruthenian Catholic Eparchy of Mukacheve from 1837 to 1864.

Born in Velyki Komyaty, Austrian Empire (present day – Ukraine) in 1796, he was ordained a priest on 10 April 1820. He was confirmed as the Bishop by the Holy See on 2 October 1837. He was consecrated to the Episcopate on 18 March 1838. The principal consecrator was Metropolitan Mykhajlo Levitsky.

He died in Uzhhorod on 19 October 1864.

References 

1796 births
1864 deaths
19th-century Eastern Catholic bishops
Ruthenian Catholic bishops
People from Zakarpattia Oblast